Milan Pavlovič (born 22 November 1980 in Nitra) is a Slovak manager and former football midfielder. Currently he is a head coach of Slovak 3. liga club TJ Družstevník Veľké Ludince.

References

FC ViOn profile 

1980 births
Living people
Slovak footballers
Slovak football managers
Association football midfielders
OFK 1948 Veľký Lapáš players
FK Senica players
FC ViOn Zlaté Moravce players
Slovak Super Liga players
Sportspeople from Nitra